Echizen may refer to:
 Echizen Province, an old province of Japan
 Echizen, Fukui, a city in Fukui Prefecture
 Echizen, Fukui (town), a town adjacent to said city, in Fukui Prefecture
 Nomura's jellyfish, also known as Echizen jellyfish
 Mount Echizen-dake, in Shizuoka Prefecture